Halit Ergenç (born 30 April 1970) is a Turkish actor known for his role as Sultan Suleiman I in Muhteşem Yüzyıl, Onur Aksal in Binbir Gece and Cevdet in Vatanim Sensin.

Biography
Halit Ergenç was born as the son of Yeşilçam-era actor Mehmet Sait Ergenç on 30 April 1970 in Istanbul. His maternal grandmother is of Albanian descent. He completed his secondary education at Beşiktaş Atatürk High School in 1989 and entered Istanbul Technical University to study Marine Engineering. He graduated from the Operetta and Musical Theatre Department of the Mimar Sinan Fine Arts University. He supported himself working as a computer operator and marketer. He briefly worked as a backing vocalist and dancer for Ajda Pekkan and Leman Sam.

In 1996, Ergenç began acting at the Dormen Theatre and had his first leading role in the musical The King and I. He gained recognition with his role in the television series Kara Melek.
He continued working in theatre in plays such as Kiss Me, Kate, Tatlı Charity, Beni Seviyor, Kral ve Ben, Amphitrion 2000, Evita, Hayalet and Ötekiler and Şarkılar Susarsa. Following appearances in series Köşe Kapmaca and Böyle mi Olacaktı, he went to New York and acted in the musical The Adventures of Zak.

In 2000, he acted in both films Hiç Yoktan Aşk and Ölümün El Yazısı as well as in series Dedem, Gofret ve Ben and Zerda. Then, he appeared in a number of plays such as Bugün Git Yarın Gel, Popcorn, Arapsaçı and Sevgilime Göz Kulak Ol. In 2004, he took part in the series Aliye with Sanem Çelik and Nejat İşler.

In 2005 and 2006, Ergenç took part in the films Babam ve Oğlum directed by Çağan Irmak, The Net 2.0, Tramway and İlk Aşk. In 2006, he starred as Onur Aksal in the hit series Binbir Gece that aired until 2009. During this period he also had roles in the films Devrim Arabaları which was based on a true story and Acı Aşk. Ergenç also starred as Mustafa Kemal Atatürk in the film Dersimiz Atatürk. In 2011 he starred as Suleiman the Magnificent in the hit series Muhteşem Yüzyıl until 2014.

Ergenç was involved in the Gezi protests of 2013, appearing in newspaper photos wearing a Bob Marley T-shirt and surgical mask for protection against tear gas. His presence made for interesting copy, since he at once played the role of one of the Ottoman Empire's foremost leaders in the show Muhteşem Yüzyıl, and at the same time he was protesting the actions of a government very much invested in celebrating Ottoman glory. Ergenç was subsequently summoned with other cultural leaders to a meeting with Turkish Prime Minister Tayyip Erdoğan, and Erdoğan apparently quizzed Ergenç on Ottoman words used by Suleiman, the character whom Ergenç played in Muhteşem Yüzyıl.

After, he played Fatali Khan Khoyski who the first Prime Minister of the independent Azerbaijan Democratic Republic in Ali & Nino. He played in the movie İstanbul Kırmızısı directed by Ferzan Özpetek. In 2016, he started playing opposite his wife Bergüzar Korel in Vatanım Sensin.

Personal life 
He is married to actress Bergüzar Korel with whom he has two sons named Ali and Han, and a daughter named Leyla. His younger brother Mehmet Sait Ergenç—named for their father—is also an actor. He has stated that he likes Zeki Demirkubuz's style and Ferzan Özpetek's emotion, but prefers to work the most with Reha Erdem and Çağan Irmak, whom he describes as both young and talented directors.

In 2017, Ergenç visited Pakistan and attended the Lux Style Awards, where he was honoured with the International Icon of the year award, due to his popularity in the country. In his accepting speech, Ergenç said that he had grown up knowing Pakistan as a "brother country".

Filmography

Movies

TV series

References

External links

 
 Halit Ergenç: Suleiman the Magnificent, Modern King Shahryār and more

1970 births
Living people
Male actors from Istanbul
Turkish male film actors
Turkish male television actors
Turkish male stage actors
Mimar Sinan Fine Arts University alumni
Golden Butterfly Award winners